This article is about the particular significance of the year 1709 to Wales and its people.

Incumbents
Lord Lieutenant of North Wales (Lord Lieutenant of Anglesey, Caernarvonshire, Denbighshire, Flintshire, Merionethshire, Montgomeryshire) – Hugh Cholmondeley, 1st Earl of Cholmondeley
Lord Lieutenant of South Wales (Lord Lieutenant of Glamorgan, Brecknockshire, Cardiganshire, Carmarthenshire, Monmouthshire, Pembrokeshire, Radnorshire) – Thomas Herbert, 8th Earl of Pembroke

Bishop of Bangor – John Evans
Bishop of Llandaff – John Tyler
Bishop of St Asaph – William Fleetwood
Bishop of St Davids – George Bull

Events
19 July - David Parry is appointed keeper of the Ashmolean Museum, in succession to Edward Lhuyd.
1 December - William Gambold, son of John Gambold of Puncheston, becomes rector of Puncheston with Llanychaer. 
date unknown
Griffith Jones (Llanddowror) takes charge of a school at Laugharne. 
The "Company of Mine Adventures", headed by Humphrey Mackworth, goes bankrupt.  
Humphrey Foulkes becomes rector of Marchwiel.)

Arts and literature

New books
Edward Holdsworth - The mouse-trap; or, The Welsh engagement with the mice (a mock-heroic satire on the Welsh people, published anonymously)

Births
March - William Wynn, clergyman and poet (died 1760)
11 June - Philip David, Independent minister (died 1787)
date unknown
Sir William Glynne, 5th Baronet (died 1730)  
Joseph Hoare, academic (died 1802)
David Williams, schoolmaster (died 1784)

Deaths
22 January - Henry Herbert, 1st Baron Herbert of Chirbury, politician, 54
6 June - James Herbert, politician, about 55
30 June - Edward Lhuyd, naturalist and antiquary, 49
22 August - John Jones, clergyman and physician, 63/64
August - Huw Morus, poet, 86/87

See also
1709 in Scotland

References

1700s in Wales
Years of the 18th century in Wales